Sutherland House may refer to:

in England
Sutherland House, Southwold, an inn and restaurant in Southwold, Suffolk, England, a Grade II* listed building in Waveney

in the United States
(by state, then city)

Langford and Lydia McMichael Sutherland Farmstead, Pittsfield Charter Township, Michigan, listed on the National Register of Historic Places (NRHP) in Washtenaw County
Sutherland House (Plymouth, Michigan), listed as a Michigan State Historic Site in Wayne County
D.H. Sutherland House, La Luz, New Mexico, listed on the NRHP in Otero County
Daniel Sutherland House, Cornwall, New York, listed on the National Register of Historic Places (NRHP)
David Sutherland House, Cornwall, New York, listed on the NRHP
Cromwell Manor, also known as the Joseph Sutherland House, Cornwall, New York, listed on the NRHP
John Sutherland House, Eugene, Oregon, listed on the NRHP
Sutherland House (Petersburg, Virginia), listed on the NRHP